Xichuan is a town of Qin'an County, Gansu, China. , it has eight residential neighborhoods and 22 villages under its administration.
Neighborhoods
Wuchuan
Xiawangxia
Zhengqiao
Zhangpo
Songxia
Zheqiao
Wangwan
Lipu

Villages
Anping Village
Gaopu Village
Shenmingchuan Village
Chuankou Village
Pailou Village
Houxin Village
Luochuan Village
Songchang Village
Luopu Village
Liwa Village
Hewan Village
Wangpu Village
Yawan Village
Jiangpu Village
Wangxia Village
Shuigou Village
Xiaozhai Village
Xiaozhuang Village
Jiaoshan Village
Jiangwan Village
Zhangxin Village
Zhangping Village

References

Township-level divisions of Gansu
Qin'an County